Ventura County Fusion is an American soccer team based in Ventura, California, United States. Founded in 2006, the team plays in USL League Two, the fourth tier of the American Soccer Pyramid.

The team plays its home games in the stadium on the campus of Ventura College, the VC SportsPlex, where they have played since 2011. The team's colors are blue, orange and white. All home games are streamed live on the Fusion's YouTube channel.  All broadcasts are done in conjunction with CAPS TV in Ventura.

History
The Fusion entered the Premier Development League in 2007 as the first ever soccer franchise from the Ventura County area of Southern California. They played their first competitive game on April 28, 2007, beating fellow expansion franchise Lancaster Rattlers 2–1, and setting the wheels in motion for what turned out to be a promising first season. Four wins in their next five games – including impressive victories over traditional regional powerhouses Fresno Fuego and Orange County Blue Star – propelled the Fusion to the top of the table by mid-season. However, a spate of injuries began to take its toll on their roster, and by the middle of July the Fusion were stuttering towards the finish line, still in with a shout of making the playoffs, but being hampered by damaging defeats to Fresno and the Southern California Seahorses. By the time the final set of games came round, Fusion needed three points from their final two games to leapfrog the San Fernando Valley Quakes into the playoffs, but two consecutive ties – 3–3 with Southern California Seahorses and a hugely disappointing 0–0 with Los Angeles Storm – meant that they finished their debut season fourth in the table. English striker Mark Draycott was the team's leading marksman, notching an impressive ten goals, while Eric Avila and Chance Myers led the assist stats.

In the offseason, Fusion played against English Premier League side Everton in a closed friendly at the Home Depot Center on July 24, 2007.  The match was organised by head coach Smith, who "wanted it to be a reward for their great play during their inaugural season". Later, in early 2008, Fusion hosted games against Hammarby of the Swedish Allsvenskan, and Real Salt Lake and Columbus Crew of MLS. Fusion enjoyed a 1–0 victory over a Columbus side that included MLS veterans such as Frankie Hejduk, despite playing without all their college players, due to NCAA regulations.

Ventura started their second competitive season without the services of Chance Myers and Eric Avila, both of whom had been taken in the 2008 MLS SuperDraft, and Mark Draycott, who had returned to England to play for Swindon Supermarine. Despite this, anticipation was high that success would be swift, but they actually started the season sluggishly, losing two of their first four games, and not picking up a victory until their 3–0 triumph over Fresno Fuego in late May. This signalled an about-turn in form; Fusion enjoyed four wins in June, including an impressive 4–1 thrashing of Fresno Fuego away from home. Two more impressive victories – 2–0 over Southern California Seahorses and 4–0 over Lancaster Rattlers – kept Fusion's playoff run on course, but a shock 1–0 defeat to struggling Orange County Blue Star at home meant that they had to beat eventual divisional champions San Fernando Valley Quakes in their next game, or their season would be over. The Quakes won 3–2 in a bad-tempered game at Pierce College, and Ventura were left rueing another year of missed opportunities. They eventually finished the season in 3rd, just two points out of the playoffs; Hagop Chirishian was the team's top scorer, with 4 goals, while former Chivas USA midfielder Rodrigo López led with 3 assists.

On July 21, 2009 the Fusion played Burnley of the Barclays Premier League, however the superior class showed through and despite a spirited showing the Fusion went down 5–0.

2009 was a breakout year for Fusion. Having added former MLS players Ivan Becerra, Anthony Hamilton and Adam Smarte to the roster during the offseason, Ventura looked like a decent bet to qualify for the post-season for the first time. Things did not start well; they drew 2–2 with Bakersfield Brigade in their opening game of the season, and then were thumped 4–0 at home by the Hollywood United Hitmen next time out. The hammering, however, seemed to bring things into focus, and things improved sharply. From then on, Ventura embarked on an astonishing 12-game unbeaten streak that included six ties and hard-fought victories away at the Ogden Outlaws, a 3–2 revenge win away at Hollywood, and a 4–2 goal fest at home to the BYU Cougars in which Anthony Hamilton scored a brace. A nervy 1–0 loss to the Los Angeles Legends on the last day of the regular season meant that the Fusion finished third in the Southwest division, but sneaked into the playoffs by the back door as the lowest seed in the West. Fusion beat the Legends 2–1 in the first round of the playoffs thanks to early goals by Alfonso Motagalvan and Anthony Hamilton, and then defeated divisional champions Hollywood in extra time thanks to two late goals by Sam Myerson. For the national quarter finals Ventura travelled to Laredo, Texas, and dispatched Northwest division champions Kitsap Pumas 2–1 on an injury-time free kick from Rodrigo López, and then demolished the Bradenton Academics 6–1 in searing heat to qualify for their first ever PDL Champiohsip game. Ventura hosted the final, which was broadcast live on Fox Soccer Channel, and snatched a victory from out of the hands of Chicago Fire Premier with an injury time winner from Alfonso Motagalvan, despite playing for most of the match with ten men. Artur Aghasyan and Anthony Hamilton were Ventura's regular-season top scorers, with 8 goals each, while Hamilton and Hagop Chirishian contributed 3 assists apiece.

On July 15, 2014, Fusion played a friendly match against Rangers from Glasgow, Scotland, which the Fusion won 3–1.

On July 15, 2018, Jermaine Jones played his last game of competitive football with the Fusion in a 1–0 home loss to FC Golden State Force.

Players

Notable former players
This list of notable former players comprises players who went on to play professional soccer after playing for the team in the Premier Development League, or those who previously played professionally before joining the team.

  Vardan Adzemian
  Artur Aghasyan
  Jean Alexandre
  Jaime Ambriz
  Rony Argueta
  Jack Avesyan
  Mathayo Huma
  Eric Avila
  Diego Barrera
  Ivan Becerra
  Bryan Byrne
  Achille Campion
  Javier Castro
  Hagop Chirishian
  Mark Draycott
  Michael Enfield
  Gabriel Farfan
  Michael Farfan
  Michael Ghebru
  Manny Guzman
  Anthony Hamilton
  J. J. Koval
  Rodrigo López
  Alfonso Motagalvan
  Chance Myers
  Anton Peterlin
  Nelson Pizarro
  Dylan Riley
  Brad Rusin
  Jamie Scope
  Willie Sims
  Thomaz
  Marcus Watson
  Brent Whitfield
  Gyasi Zardes
  Henry Brauner
  Brian Rowe
  Abu Danladi
  Joe Holland 
  Nick DePuy 
  Justin Vom Steeg
  Daniel Steres
  James Kiffe
  Jochen Graf
  Michael Daly
  Brandon Vincent
  Earl Edwards Jr.
  Matt LaGrassa
  Rony Argueta
  Tony Alfaro
  Javan Torre
  Ismaila Jome

Year-by-year

Honors 
 USL PDL Southwest Division Champions: 2010, 2012, 2014
 USL PDL Western Conference Champions: 2009
 USL PDL Champions: 2009
 USL League Two Western Conference Champions: 2022
 USL League Two Champions: 2022

Notable Matches

Head coaches
  Graham Smith (2007–2009)
  Ole Mikkelsen (2010–2012)
  Rudy Ybarra (2013–2019)
  Mike Elias (2019–Present)

Stadia
 Bulldog Stadium at Buena High School; Ventura, California (2007–2010)
 Panther Stadium at Newbury Park High School; Thousand Oaks, California, 2 games (2007–2008)
 Stadium at Ventura College; Ventura, California (2009, 2011–present)

References

External links

 

Association football clubs established in 2006
USL League Two teams
Soccer clubs in Greater Los Angeles
2006 establishments in California
Ventura, California